Boy with a Glass and a Lute is an oil-on-canvas painting by the Dutch Golden Age painter Frans Hals, painted in 1626 and now in the Guildhall Art Gallery, London.

Painting 
The painting shows a boy with a lute who is holding a glass above his head with his right hand; with his left hand, he balances a lute which rests on a table.

Name
In his 1910 catalog of Frans Hals works Hofstede de Groot wrote:82. THE LAUGHING MANDOLINE-PLAYER. M. 214. A young man with long dishevelled hair sits holding up in his right hand a glass full of wine, at which he looks with a smile. His dark costume is trimmed with blue; his cap hangs on the back of his head, to the left. With his left hand he holds up one end of a mandoline, the other end of which rests on a table. Signed on the right with the monogram; panel, 36 inches by 30 inches.

Exhibited at the Royal Academy Winter Exhibition, London, 1891, No. 72.

Hals' positioning of a figure looking upwards was common to many of his genre paintings of the 1620s:

This painting is probably related to The Fingernail Test:

References

1626 paintings
Paintings by Frans Hals
Food and drink paintings
Collection of the Guildhall Art Gallery
Musical instruments in art